John R. Buchtel Community Learning Center, formerly known as John R. Buchtel High School and often referred to as Buchtel High School or Buchtel CLC, is a public high school in Akron, Ohio, United States, serving grades 7–12.  It is one of seven high schools in the Akron Public Schools. As of 2012, the school has an enrollment of 764 students.

History
Buchtel High School opened in 1931 and is named after Akron industrialist and philanthropist John R. Buchtel, who helped to organize and finance a number of early Akron firms, including the Goodrich Corporation.  Buchtel is best known for his role in the establishment of Buchtel College, which later became the University of Akron.  Buchtel and his wife contributed more than $500,000 to the college over the course of his life.

In 2012, the old Buchtel High School building was torn down after the completion of the new "Community Learning Center". The school was designed expand learning from grades 9-12 by including students in grades 7-8 who had previously attended Perkins Middle School. This was part of a larger project called "Imagine Akron Community Learning Centers" to rebuild or remodel all Akron Public Schools.

Starting in the 2012 - 2013 school year, the ninth and tenth graders will participate in New Tech. The New Tech is a model used in the new ways of teaching which implements modern technology, such as laptops and Smart Boards into the curriculum. Based on a version of "Project Based Learning", students complete projects to show topic and subject mastery and to integrate new types of technology specifically used for teaching.

Athletic state championships
 Boys Basketball - 2023
 Boys Football - 1987, 1988
 Boys Cross Country – 1955, 1961
 Boys Swimming - 1963
 Boys Track - 1996, 2006
 Girls Track - 2007

Notable alumni

 Billy Baldwin, former professional baseball player in Major League Baseball
 Rita Dove, Pulitzer Prize-winning poet and former Poet Laureate Consultant in Poetry to the Library of Congress
 Michael Flaksman, American cellist, winner of the Casals Centenary Award (1963)
 Howard Hewett, singer (1974)
 Art Kusnyer, former professional baseball player in Major League Baseball
 Bryan Williams, professional football player in the Canadian Football League
 Levert Carr, gridiron football player
 Ricky Powers, Former NFL player and football head coach
 Jay Brophy, Former NFL player
 Stanford Ovshinsky, scientist and inventor
 Sheldon Ocker, sportswriter
 Savannah James
 Jarrod Wilson, current NFL safety for the Jacksonville Jaguars.

External links
 Akron Public Schools official website
 John R. Buchtel Community Learning Center official website

References

High schools in Akron, Ohio
Public high schools in Ohio